is a principle known in Japan related in particular to the origin of the country, the . 

It has also been described in Japanese literature. Motoori Norinaga (1730–1801) devoted about 35 years of his life to the elaboration of a Commentary (Kojiki-den), which is still authoritative today. Each man, writes Motoori, possesses at his birth a "true heart" a "magokoro" (the term magokokoro is itself almost an onomatopoeia since kokoro, the heart, expresses these "beats of the heart") whose ancient Japanese literature is the most faithful expression.

The poetry that describes the fluctuating feelings deep within the human heart is both feminine and fragile. Its most sublime element, the characteristic element of this poetry, is the mono no aware, that is to say, the feeling of sympathy aroused by the sweet melancholy that emanates from things.

This sentiment expresses the Yamato gokoro ("Japanese heart") as opposed to the Kara gokoro ("Chinese heart") "superficial level of consciousness cluttered with masculine things, intellectually astute but full of pretension". Reflection of a happy time when the Way (tao, Michi) merged with the spontaneous expression of human feelings, Japanese literature, or at least the Narrative (Kojiki den), testifies to the superiority of the Yamato gokoro over the Kara gokoro. In Japan, a country created by the gods, the way is neither natural nor artificially instituted by men, it does not belong to the order of nature nor to that of men. It was established by the gods who gave birth to nature and men. It is not an organizing principle of Japan, but the very history of Japan itself.

The will of the gods was fulfilled first through the foundation of the islands, then it was transmitted to the emperors by their divine ancestors whose lineage would never have been interrupted.

The peculiarity of Japan lies, for Motoori, in the acceptance of human feelings which underlie naturally good behavior and make any theory unnecessary.

Articles 

 Amaterasu
 History of Japan
 Kami
 Mono no aware
 Yamato

References 

Cultural history of Japan
Empire of Japan
Japanese values
Japanese words and phrases
Yamato people